The Belgian Cup 2006–07 was the 52nd staging of the Belgian Cup which is the main knock-out football competition in Belgium, won by Club Brugge.

Results

Legend
 * = after extra-time
 D2 = second division
 D3 = third division
 P = promotion

Matches

Round 6
Teams from the first division enter the competition at this stage except for the newly promoted team, Mons, who had to start in round four and immediately lost against U.R.S. du Centre. The teams from the first division that enter at this stage are seeded and can't meet each other, except for the team that ended in 17th position last season, Lierse. Apart from the 17 teams directly qualified, 15 other teams had qualified through winning in the fifth round:
 10 from second division: Antwerp, Dessel, Eupen, Hamme, Kortrijk, KV Mechelen, Tienen, Tubize, Union and Dender EH.
 3 from third division: Cappellen, Geel and La Louvière.
 2 from promotion: Mol-Wezel and Woluwe-Zaventem.

Round 7

Quarter-finals

Leg 1

Leg 2

Semi-finals

Leg 1

Leg 2

Final

See also
Belgian Cup - main article

Belgian Cup seasons
Belgian Cup, 2006-07
2006–07 domestic association football cups